Phragmipedium klotzschianum is a species of orchid found from southeastern Venezuela to Guyana and northern Brazil.

References

External links 

klotzschianum
Orchids of Brazil
Orchids of Guyana
Orchids of Venezuela